Columbus FC might refer to:

Columbus Crew SC, American soccer team based in Columbus, Ohio
FC Columbus, American soccer team based in Columbus, Ohio
Columbus Eagles FC, American soccer team based in Columbus, Ohio
ICSF Columbus FC, Canadian soccer team based in Vancouver